David S. Mack (born 1941) is an American businessman.

Early life and education
Mack was born to a Jewish family, the son of Ruth (nee Kaufman) and H. Bert Mack (1912–1992). His father founded the real estate development company, the Mack Company. He has three brothers: Earle I. Mack, Fredric H. Mack, and William L. Mack. Mack graduated from Hofstra University in 1967 with a B.A. degree in Business Administration.

Career
Mack is senior partner of The Mack Company, a real estate development firm, and is a director of Mack-Cali Realty Corporation, a real estate investment trust (REIT).

Public service
Mack serves on the boards of Boys Town Jerusalem, Hofstra University, Israel Bonds, Joseph L. Morse Geriatric Center, New York Holocaust Memorial Committee, North Shore-Long Island Jewish Health System Foundation, Palm Beach Community Chest and United Way, Pratt Institute, United Jewish Appeal (UJA) of Greater New York and Long Island, and serves as the president of the Nassau County Police Department Foundation.

He was a Commissioner of the Port Authority of New York and New Jersey, appointed by former New York Governor George Pataki, until forced to resign in 2009.

He currently serves as 1st Assistant Commissioner for the Nassau County Police Department on Long Island, New York.

Metropolitan Transportation Authority
Mack was a Vice Chairman of the Metropolitan Transportation Authority from December, 1993 until September, 2009.  He is the Chair of the Long Island Rail Road/Long Island Bus, Bridges and Tunnels Committee, and a member of the Capital Program Oversight, Finance, Interagency Coordination, Audit, Governance, Diversity, Safety and Security, Capital Construction/Planning and Real Estate, New York City Transit, Metro-North Committees.  His term ran through June 30, 2009.

In May 2008, New York State Attorney General Andrew Cuomo announced that the MTA policy of giving free lifetime passes to current and former board members violated New York State law.  The MTA board initially resisted changing this policy.

Philanthropy
Mack has donated to scholarships and capital programs at his alma-mater, Hofstra University.  The David S. Mack Sports and Exhibition Complex, the Sondra and David S. Mack Student Center and Mack Hall are named in his honor.

Mack and his wife Sondra also make charitable donations through the David and Sondra Mack Foundation and are members of the Jewish Federation of Palm Beach County.

References

1941 births
Living people
Jewish American philanthropists
Hofstra University alumni
American real estate businesspeople
Mack family (real estate)
21st-century American Jews